Mallero is a river in the Province of Sondrio.

Course 
Its source is near the Monte del Forno, it flows south through the Valmalenco and joins the Adda after crossing Sondrio. Towns along the river include Chiesa in Valmalenco, Torre di Santa Maria and Spriana.

Tributaries
Antognasco, Lanterna, Torreggio, Entovasco, Nevasco, Forasco, Pirola, Braciasco, Giumellini, Arcoglio, Dagua, Valdone.

See also
 Valtellina disaster

References

Adda basin
Rivers of Italy
Rivers of the Alps
Rivers of the Province of Sondrio